Eucnide (stingbush) is a genus of plants in the family Loasaceae.

Species include:
Eucnide aurea (A. Gray) H.J. Thomps. & W.R. Ernst   
Eucnide bartonioides Zucc. - Yellow stingbush   
Eucnide rupestris (Baill.) H.J. Thompson & Ernst - Rock nettle, rock stingbush   
Eucnide urens (Parry ex Gray) Parry - Desert rock nettle, desert stingbush, stingbush

References
Integrated Taxonomic Information System (ITIS): Eucnide

Loasaceae
Flora of North America
Cornales genera
Taxa named by Joseph Gerhard Zuccarini